Soldadu Abdul Azizi bin Ali Rahman is a Bruneian professional footballer who plays for DPMM FC and the Brunei national team as a striker. He is the current leading goalscorer of the Brunei Super League since its establishment in 2012.

Club career

Abdul Azizi began playing for the football team of the Royal Brunei Armed Forces in 2009. He has won the Brunei FA Cup with MS ABDB for 4 consecutive times, scoring in the 2015 final. He had once scored 6 goals in one match, in an 11–1 victory over Najip FC in 2013.

He became the overall top scorer in the 2016 Brunei Super League with 8 goals to his name. He repeated this feat in the 2017–18 season, bagging 28 goals. Altogether he has won three championships and five FA Cup winner's medals with MS ABDB before his departure in 2018.

Abdul Azizi officially joined DPMM FC on 13 February 2018, uniting him with his younger brother Azwan who has been playing there since 2013. He made his Singapore Premier League debut on 24 May against Young Lions in a 1-1 draw, coming on for brother Azwan in the 70th minute. Azizi made his first start at home against Hougang United on 18 August in place of the suspended Ukrainian Volodymyr Pryyomov and duly scored a hat-trick to send DPMM to a 3–1 victory. Under Renê Weber, Abdul Azizi made only two starts in 15 appearances in the 2018 season.

After the appointment of Adrian Pennock as DPMM head coach in 2019, Abdul Azizi became a regular in the starting lineup, partnering Andrey Varankow in a 3-5-2 formation. He opened his account for the season in a 2–0 victory at home to Home United on 4 May. He altogether bagged six goals for DPMM, including the winner in a 0–1 away victory against Young Lions FC, to help his side clinch the Singapore Premier League title.

For the year 2022, DPMM played domestically in the 2022 Brunei FA Cup. Abdul Azizi registered seven goals for the campaign including a hat-trick against Jerudong FC on 16 October. His team went all the way to the final of the tournament, and prevailed over Kasuka FC 2–1 which gave Abdul Azizi his sixth Brunei FA Cup medal.

Returning to the Singapore Premier League the following year, Abdul Azizi opened his account for the season against Geylang International in a 1–3 loss on 19 March.

International career
Abdul Azizi made his international debut against Chinese Taipei on 12 March 2015, coming on for his brother Azwan Ali Rahman in the 75th minute of the 2018 World Cup qualifier first leg, which ended 1–0 to the Wasps. He came off the bench for an injured Fakharrazi Hassan on 22 minutes in the second leg on 17 March, the final result was a 0–2 reverse which eliminated Brunei from the 2018 World Cup.

Abdul Azizi scored his first international goal against Cambodia in a friendly match on 3 November 2015. Despite opening the scoring, Brunei lost 1–6. He played a bit-part role in Brunei's international tournament outings of 2016, namely the 2016 AFF Suzuki Cup qualification and the 2016 AFC Solidarity Cup.

Abdul Azizi was to play a huge role by newly-appointed Brunei coach Robbie Servais for the upcoming 2022 World Cup qualification matches in June 2019, but Abdul Azizi declined the callup due to unknown reasons.

In March 2022, Abdul Azizi was back in the fold of the national team for a friendly match on 27 March against Laos in Vientiane. He started the game in a 3–2 defeat. Two months later he made a substitute appearance in a 4–0 defeat against Malaysia in Kuala Lumpur on 27 May. On 21 September he also came off the bench on half time for the home friendly against the Maldives, which resulted in a 0–3 loss. Six days later he was played from the start against Laos and this time the Wasps emerged as victors with a 1–0 win.

On 5 November 2022 Azizi scored two goals in the first half of a 6–2 win against Timor-Leste in the first leg of the 2022 AFF Mitsubishi Electric Cup qualifying fixture held in Bandar Seri Begawan. He was a substitute in the second leg which was a 1–0 defeat, but Brunei went through to the group stage of the Cup with a 6–3 aggregate win. At the tournament held the next month, Azizi made three appearances and failed to score against the likes of Thailand, the Philippines and Indonesia whereby Brunei were consigned to defeats in all of them.

International goals

Honours

Team
MS ABDB
 Brunei Super League (3): 2015, 2016, 2017–18
 Brunei FA Cup (5): 2010, 2013, 2014, 2015, 2016
DPMM FC
 Singapore Premier League: 2019
 Brunei FA Cup: 2022

Individual
 Brunei Super League Top Scorer (2): 2016, 2017–18
 Brunei Super League Best Player: 2015

Personal life
Abdul Azizi's younger brother Azwan is also a Bruneian international who is his teammate at DPMM FC. His cousin Hendra Azam Idris is also another one of his teammates.

References

External links

1987 births
Living people
Association football forwards
Bruneian military personnel
Bruneian footballers
Brunei international footballers
DPMM FC players
MS ABDB players
Place of birth missing (living people)